Nam Chan is a tambon (sub-district) of Seka District, in Bueng Kan Province, Thailand. In 2015 it had a population of 6,418 persons.

History
The subdistrict was created effective 1 May 1981, splitting off from Seka Sub-district.

Administration

Central administration
The tambon is divided into 13 administrative villages (mubans).

Local administration
The sub-district is governed by the sub-district administrative organization (SAO) Nam Chan (องค์การบริหารส่วนตำบลน้ำจั้น).

References

External links
Thaitambon.com on Nam Chan

Tambon of Bueng Kan province
Populated places in Bueng Kan province

Seka District